FC Trollhättan is a Swedish football club located in Trollhättan currently playing in Division 1.

Background
The club was founded in 2001, when the old rivals Trollhättans IF and Trollhättans FK decided to merge.

In their first league match ever, against Ljungskile SK away at Skarsjövallen on April 22, 2002, in Division II (Sweden's third league at that time) they won 1–0 and the historic goal scorer was Michel Berndtsson when he scored the game winner in the 79th minute.

In their first ever home game, April 28, 2002, against Askims IK, FCT won 1–0. A local newspaper Trollhättans tidning paid for all the spectators; the attendance was 3,083 people

June 6, 2002, the supporter club FCT Black Support was founded.

On September 26, 2002, FCT defeated Askims IK away with the score of 3–1, that secures the league win, and qualification against Falkenbergs FF awaited for a place in Superettan in a double-meeting. October 12, 2002, the home game against Falkenberg resulted in a 3–2 win. A week later on October 19, FCT was promoted to Superettan when Henrik Bertilsson (former Allsvenskan and professional player) headed in the 2–1 goal.

At the beginning of the 2004 season, Jonas Olsson took over as coach and remained at that position until the 2006 season had ended. His successor Lars-Olof Mattsson has coached the Swedish U21 team, Degerfors IF and Ljungskile SK, when they won promotion to Allsvenskan for their first time in 1996.

Season to season

Current squad

 

For season transfers, see either transfers winter 2009–2010 or transfers summer 2010.

Achievements

League
 Division 1
 Winners (1): 2008
 Division 2
 Winners (2):''' 2002 and 2015

Footnotes

External links
 Official site

Football clubs in Västra Götaland County
Sport in Västra Götaland County
Association football clubs established in 2001
2001 establishments in Sweden